Amar Malkiat Singh is an Indian physician, bureaucrat and Member of Parliament for Fatehgarh Sahib constituency.

References

External links
Official biographical sketch in Parliament of India website

Lok Sabha members from Punjab, India
People from Ludhiana district
Living people
Indian National Congress politicians from Punjab, India
Politicians from Ludhiana
India MPs 2019–present
1953 births